John Holland (born February 28, 1952) is a former gridiron football wide receiver who played in the National Football League and the Canadian Football League.

Early life
Holland was born in Beckley, West Virginia and grew up in Middletown, Ohio, where he attended Middletown High School.

College career
Holland played college football for the Tennessee State Tigers. As a senior he caught 53 passes for 739 yards and 11 touchdowns and was named third-team Little All-America by the Associated Press as the Tigers won the 1973 Black College National Championship. Holland finished his collegiate career with 109 receptions for 1,622 yards and 22 touchdowns.

Professional career
Holland was selected by the Minnesota Vikings in the second round of the 1974 NFL Draft. He caught five passes for 84 yards as a rookie. Holland was cut during the 1975 preseason and was signed by the Buffalo Bills. He caught passes of 53 and 58 yards for touchdowns in the 1976 season opener against the Miami Dolphins on Monday Night Football. He was a starter for the Bills at the beginning of the 1977 season but was put on season-ending injured reserve after breaking his jaw three games in.  Holland became a free agent after the season and was not signed by any team for the 1978 season. Holland finished his NFL career with 35 receptions for 634 yards and three touchdowns.

Holland was signed by the Hamilton Tiger-Cats of the Canadian Football League (CFL) and spent the 1979 and 1980 seasons with the team. He spent two more years in the CFL with the Calgary Stampeders in 1981 and the Ottawa Rough Riders in 1982. In four CFL seasons Holland caught 149 passes for 2,532 yards and 10 touchdowns.

References

1952 births
Living people
American football wide receivers
Tennessee State Tigers football players
Sportspeople from Middletown, Ohio
Sportspeople from Beckley, West Virginia
Players of American football from West Virginia
Players of American football from Ohio
Minnesota Vikings players
Buffalo Bills players
Hamilton Tiger-Cats players
Calgary Stampeders players
Ottawa Rough Riders players
African-American players of Canadian football
21st-century African-American people
20th-century African-American sportspeople